The Toofan, sometimes known as Toufan or Tufan, is an Iranian MRAP armored vehicle. It was designed and manufactured by the Iranian Ministry of Defence to enter into service with the IRGC Ground Forces and NAJA.

History
The MRAP was first seen at the 2016 IPAS convention in Iran. The Toofan was publicly unveiled on November 20, 2018 with Defense Minister Brigadier General Amir Hatami attending the event.

After the MRAP was unveiled, Streit Group has mentioned that they are looking into legal options for a redress.

Design 
The Toofan was developed to provide Iranian forces with a highly mobile vehicle that is capable of carrying out logistics and combat missions in all possible theaters of war. The features of the Toofan are that it is ambush protected with ballistic protection to resist land mines, improvised explosive devices (IEDs) and steel core bullets. It can be outfitted with STANAG 2 or 3 protection.

It has a 360 hp engine with the Toofan able to drive through 1.5 meters of water and climbing barriers as high as 50 centimeters. It can carry up to 10 personnel and is equipped with run-flat tires which enables it to drive for 50 kilometers with a flat tire. It can also drive at speeds of up to 100 km/h.

Its appearance resembles the Streit Group’s Typhoon MRAP with similarities based on its physical appearance and its dimensions.

Armaments
The Toofan can be equipped with semi-heavy weapons onto the tailgate gun shields and turrets, including a 12.7 heavy machine gun with gun shield.

Cost 
The cost of the program is disclosed but during his address to the press, Brigadier General Hatami stated that "such a vehicle costs around $500,000 in the international market, [while] Iranian experts have manufactured [the] Toofan at a much lower price."

Operators

 : Islamic Revolutionary Guard Corps and Iranian police (NAJA).

Non-State Actors
  Popular Mobilization Forces

References 

Armoured fighting vehicles of Iran
Armoured fighting vehicles of the post–Cold War period
Military vehicles introduced in the 2010s
Wheeled armoured personnel carriers